Events from the year 1831 in Russia.

Incumbents
 Monarch – Nicholas I

Events

 
 
  
  
 
 
 
 
 Cross of St. George
 Kuopio Province
 Rumyantsev Museum
 Order of the White Eagle (Russian Empire)
 November Uprising

Births

 Maria A. Neidgardt, courtier  (d. 1904)
 Nicholas Nikolaevich
 Antoire Buchaswski

Deaths

 Hans Karl von Diebitsch

References

1831 in Russia
Years of the 19th century in the Russian Empire